The Texas A&M University Irma Lerma Rangel School of Pharmacy, located on the campus of Texas A&M University–Kingsville, is the newest addition to the Texas A&M Health Science Center.

The inaugural class recently graduated on Saturday May 15, 2010. The 2009-2010 year was the first year to have all four classes enrolled.

Starting in the Fall of 2014, Texas A&M University in College Station has admitted an inaugural class of 33 student pharmacists to the Doctorate of Pharmacy program. The admissions rate is 60%

External links
Irma Lerma Rangel College of Pharmacy Website

Texas A&M University System
Pharmacy schools in Texas
Kingsville, Texas